Jean-Yves Cuendet (born February 20, 1970) is a retired Swiss nordic combined skier who competed during the 1990s. He won a bronze medal in the 3 x 10 km team event at the 1994 Winter Olympics in Lillehammer. Cuendet also won a bronze medal in the 4 x 5 km team event at the 1995 FIS Nordic World Ski Championships in Thunder Bay, Ontario.

References 

1970 births
Living people
Swiss male Nordic combined skiers
Nordic combined skiers at the 1994 Winter Olympics
Nordic combined skiers at the 1998 Winter Olympics
Olympic medalists in Nordic combined
FIS Nordic World Ski Championships medalists in Nordic combined
Medalists at the 1994 Winter Olympics
Olympic bronze medalists for Switzerland